Florian Kettemer (born June 10, 1986) is a German professional ice hockey defenceman who is currently an unrestricted free agent. He most recently played for Eisbären Berlin of the Deutsche Eishockey Liga (DEL). . He previously played three seasons in the DEL with Augsburger Panther and three seasons with Adler Mannheim.
On April 1, 2014, Kettemer signed a one-year contract as a free agent with his third DEL club, EHC München.

After four seasons in Munich and having claimed the previous three championships, Kettemer left as a free agent to sign an initial four-month contract with Eisbären Berlin on August 1, 2018.

Career statistics

Regular season and playoffs

International

References

External links

1986 births
Living people
Adler Mannheim players
Augsburger Panther players
Eisbären Berlin players
EHC München players
German ice hockey defencemen
People from Kaufbeuren
Sportspeople from Swabia (Bavaria)